Events from the year 1831 in art.

Events
June 21 – The North Carolina State House is razed in a blaze and therein the roof collapses on Antonio Canova's 1820 statue of George Washington, smashing it to pieces.
October 29–31 – The 1831 Bristol riots in England are observed by local artist William James Müller who paints a series of sketches of the city in flames.
December – Clarkson Stanfield's spectacular panorama Venice and Its Adjacent Islands is staged in London as part of the annual Christmas pantomime.
date unknown
John Constable, in charge of hanging the Royal Academy of Arts' annual exhibition in London, at the last minute gives his own Salisbury Cathedral from the Meadows a prominent position in place of J. M. W. Turner's Caligula's Palace and Bridge.
Publication of John Martin's mezzotint illustrations to The Bible begins.
The New Society of Painters in Water Colours is established in London.

Works

Sir William Beechey – Princess Adelaide of Saxe-Meiningen
Karl Blechen – Tivoli Gardens at the Villa d'Este
Léon Cogniet – Jean-François Champollion
John Constable – Salisbury Cathedral from the Meadows
Eugène Delacroix – A Young Tiger Playing with its Mother
Paul Delaroche – King Edward V and the Duke of York in the Tower of London
Caspar David Friedrich - The Great Enclosure
Joseph von Führich – Triumph of Christ (Raczyński Palace, Berlin)
Hiroshige – Famous Places in the Eastern Capital
Edwin Landseer – A Distinguished Member of the Humane Society
Ivan Martos – Alexander I Statue in Taganrog
James Northcote - Chess Players
Richard Westmacott – "The Copper Horse" (equestrian statue of George III of the United Kingdom, Windsor Great Park)

Births
February 23 – Hendrik Willem Mesdag, Dutch marine painter (died 1915)
March 12 – Benjamin Williams Leader (born Benjamin Leader Williams), English landscape painter (died 1923)
July 3 – Jacques Émile Édouard Brandon, French artist (died 1897)
July 21 – Martha Maxwell, American naturalist and artist (died 1881)
July 28 – J. L. K. van Dort, Ceylonese illustrator (died 1898)
August 14 – Adolf von Becker, Finnish-born painter (died 1909)
October 26 – Nathaniel Hone the Younger, Irish painter (died 1917)
December 7 – Joanna Mary Boyce, English painter (died 1861)

Deaths
 January 6 – Ryōkan, Japanese Sōtō Zen Buddhist monk poet and calligrapher (born 1758)
 February 2 – Vincenzo Dimech, Maltese sculptor (born 1768)
 February 17 – William Armfield Hobday,  English portrait painter and miniaturist (born 1771)
 March 22 – John Warwick Smith, British watercolour landscape painter and illustrator (born 1749)
 April 8 – Domenico Aspari, Italian painter and engraver (born 1746)
 May 8 – Emanuel Thelning, Swedish-born, Finnish painter (born 1767)
 May 24 – James Peale, American miniaturist and still-life painter, a younger brother of Charles Willson Peale  (born 1749)
 May 25 – Mather Brown, portrait and historical painter (born 1761)
 June 1 – John Jackson, English portrait painter (born 1778)
 June 12 – Pierre Cartellier, French sculptor (born 1757)
 June 18 – Francesco Manno, Italian painter and architect (born 1754)
 July 11 – Richard Duppa, English writer and draughtsman (born 1770)
 July 13 – James Northcote, English painter (born 1746)
 August 5 – Richard Collins, English chief miniature and enamel painter to George III (born 1755)
 August 17 – Patrick Nasmyth, Scottish landscape painter (born 1787)
 August 27 – François Dumont, French painter of portrait miniatures (born 1751)
 September 15 – Christian David Gebauer, Danish animal painter and etcher (born 1777)
 September 17 – Joseph Lange, actor and amateur painter (born 1751)
 November 5 – Johan Frederik Clemens, Danish etcher and printmaker (born 1749)
 November 19 – Carl Conjola, German landscape painter (born 1773)
 December 17 – Amalia von Helvig, German and Swedish artist, writer, translator, and influential intellectual (born 1776)

References

 
Years of the 19th century in art
1830s in art